The Ancient Egyptians called the Mediterranean Wadj-wr/Wadj-Wer/Wadj-Ur. This term was the name given by the Ancient Egyptians to the semi-solid, semi-aquatic region characterized by papyrus forests to the north of the cultivated Nile Delta, and, by extension, the sea beyond.

The term  appears later: Solinus apparently used this in the 3rd century, but the earliest extant witness to it is in the 6th century, in Isidore of Seville.

The original meaning may have been 'the sea in the middle of the earth', rather than 'the sea enclosed by land'.

Ancient Iranians called it the "Roman Sea", in Classic Persian texts was called  which may be from Middle Persian form, .

The Carthaginians called it the "Syrian Sea". In ancient Syriac texts, Phoenician epics and in the Hebrew Bible, it was primarily known as the "Great Sea", (Numbers; Book of Joshua; Ezekiel) or simply as "The Sea" (1 Kings).  However, it has also been called the "Hinder Sea" because of its location on the west coast of Greater Syria or the Holy Land (and therefore behind a person facing the east), which is sometimes translated as "Western Sea". Another name was the "Sea of the Philistines", (Book of Exodus), from the people inhabiting a large portion of its shores near the Israelites. In Modern Hebrew, it is called  , 'the Middle Sea'. In Classic Persian texts was called  ) "The Western Sea" or "Syrian Sea".

In Modern Arabic, it is known as  'the [White] Middle Sea'. At first, that name referred to only the Eastern Mediterranean, but it was later extended to the whole Mediterranean.

In Turkish, it is the  'the White Sea'; in Ottoman, which sometimes means only the Aegean Sea. The origin of the name is not clear, as it is not known in earlier Greek, Byzantine or Islamic sources. It may be to contrast with the Black Sea. It is probably the origin of the colloquial Greek phrase  (lit. "White Sea").

According to Johann Knobloch, in classical antiquity, cultures in the Levant used colours to refer to the cardinal points: black referred to the north (explaining the name Black Sea), yellow or blue to east, red to south (e.g., the Red Sea), and white to west. This would explain the Greek , the Bulgarian 
, the Turkish , and the Arab nomenclature described above,  "White Sea".

It is known colloquially by United States Navy sailors, making regular six month deployments to the area, as "The Med".

References

Mediterranean Sea
Names of places in Europe
Names of places in Africa
Names of places in Asia